Stéphan Aubé (born 11 November 1971) is a French Music video director for classical music and pianist.

Biography 
Stéphan Aubé started to study piano at the age of five.

He studied at the Conservatoire à Rayonnement Régional of Boulogne-Billancourt, where he won first prize in Geneviève Ibanez's class, then at the Conservatoire à Rayonnement Régional of Paris with Billy Eidi and Pierre Reach.

He also studied with Jacques Rouvier, Jean-Marc Luisada, Philippe Cassard, Géry Moutier, Pascal Devoyon, Georges Pludermacher, Jean-François Heisser and Maria Curcio and chamber music repertory with Paul Meyer and Éric Le Sage. In parallel, he studied ballet from age 8 to 16 with teachers such as Michelle Perrot, Evelyne Wolff and Jacqueline Moreau (from Opéra de Paris) at the Conservatoire à Rayonnement Régional of Boulogne-Billancourt.

As a director, he worked for many French TV channels, including arte, France Télévisions, Mezzo TV, TV5 or for the Louisiana Museum of Modern Art (Denmark), the French label Abeille musique, the French sponsor Mécénat Musical Société Générale (for which he won several prices) and medici.tv, and for many labels, such as Universal Classics, Naïve Records, RCA Red Seal / Sony Music, and Outhere.

He works regularly for the Berlin Philharmonic Digital Concert Hall and for the Louisiana Museum of Modern Art in Denmark.

In 2013, he created the web platform Louisiana Music to present the musical clips he directed for the Louisiana Museum of Modern Art.

In 2014, France Télévisions asked him to direct a concert conducted by John Eliot Gardiner (Monteverdi's Vespers) at the Chapelle royale of Versailles, one of the first concerts filmed in multicameras live in 4K (UHD) and binaural sound.

Recently he directed a film on Bach's Goldberg Variations with pianist Alexandre Tharaud for Warner/Erato and arte for which he won the Echo Award (Germany) as Best DVD of the year 2016.

Works

TV Shows

La leçon de musique de Jean-François Zygel 
 Episode Wolfgang Amadeus Mozart with Paul Meyer and Quatuor Ébène
 Episode Franz Schubert with Nora Gubisch, Laurent Alvaro and quatuor Ébène

Les clefs de l'orchestre de Jean-François Zygel 
 Episode  Symphony 103 of Joseph Haydn with Ton Koopman
 Episode Boléro of Maurice Ravel with Kazushi Ono
 Episode Pastoral symphony of Ludwig van Beethoven with Paul Mc Creesch
 Episode New World Symphony of Anton Dvorak with Myung-Whun Chung

Others 
 J.S. Bach : "Variations Goldberg" with Alexandre Tharaud (arte)
 A day in the life of Patricia Kopatchinskaja, video direction of the filming of the Berlin Philharmonie's concert

Berlin Philharmonic's Digital Concert Hall 
 Tokyo Spring Festival - Chamber Music with Members of the Berlin Philharmonic Orchestra filmed at the Berlin Philharmonie with Daishin Kashimoto, Olaf Maninger and Ohad Ben-Ari (2021)
 Daniel Barenboim and Emmanuel Pahud, Concerto for flute by Jacques Ibert and Symphonie Fantastique by Hector Berlioz (2020)
 Beethoven Marathon with Albrecht Mayer and other musicians of the Berlin Philharmonic Orchestra (2020)
 Brett Dean Premiere of The Last Days of Socrates - Michael Tippett, A Child of Our Time conducted by Sir Simon Rattle (2013)
 Debussy, Messiaen, Tchaikovsky conducted by Christian Thielemann (2012)
 Debussy, Dvorak, Schoenberg and Elgar conducted by Sir Simon Rattle (2012)
 Piano Concerto No. 2 of Brahms - interpreted by Leif Ove Andsnes and conducted by Bernard Haitink (2011)
 Rachmaninov - Malher - conducted by Sir Simon Rattle (2010)
 Bach - Mozart - Haydn - interpreted and conducted by András Schiff (2010)
 Maurice Ravel's Piano Concerto in G major interpreted by Hélène Grimaud and conducted by Tugan Sokhiev (2010)
 Schoenberg - Brahms - conducted by Sir Simon Rattle (2009)
 Elijah of Felix Mendelssohn - conducted by Seiji Ozawa (2009)

Concerts 
 Jakub Hrůša conducts Mozart and Bruckner — Bamberg Symphony Orchestra with Piotr Anderszewski, piano (2020)
 Perpetual Music Concert — With Sonya Yoncheva, Michael Volle, Avi Avital live from Staatsoper Berlin, Germany (2020)
 Louis XIV’s Coronation at the Royal Chapel of Château de Versailles, Ensemble Correspondances under the direction of Sébastien Daucé - Filmed in Ultra High Definition (2019)
 Tribute to the 150th anniversary of the death of Hector Berlioz at the Opéra Royal of Château de Versailles under the direction of Sir John Eliot Gardiner and filmed in Ultra High Definition (2018)
 Charpentier Te Deum at Saint John's Co-Cathedral, Malta - Ensemble Correspondances under conducting of Sébastien Daucé and filmed in Ultra High Definition - France 2 (broadcast live on Culture Box) (2017)
 J.S. Bach : "Variations Goldberg" with Alexandre Tharaud - Arte - Echo Award for Best DVD of the Year 2016 (2016)
 100 years commemoration of armenian genocide, concert under conducting of Alain Altinoglu at the Théâtre du Châtelet, Paris. - France Télévisions, live (2015)
 Concert of Sergey Khachatryan and the Orchestre de Paris conducted by Gianandrea Noseda at the Salle Pleyel - arte, live (2014)
 Les Légendes d'Arménie conducted by Alain Altinoglu at the Opéra Comique of Paris - France Télévisions, live (2014)
 Vêpres solennelles de la Vierge from Claudio Monteverdi with the Monteverdi Choir and The English Baroque Soloists under the conducting of John Eliot Gardiner. Filmed in Ultra High Definition Live France Télévisions (2014)
 The night of Fantomas in live from the Theatre du Chatelet, Paris. 5 Films (1913) from the French director Louis Feuillade remastered by Gaumont with musical accompaniment under the musical direction of Yann Tiersen for arte live web and ZDF (2013)
 Les Salons de musique with Julie Fuchs and the musicians of the Cercle de l'harmonie in live on Arte Live Web (2013)
 Tamara Stefanovich, Thomas Bloch and the Junge Philharmonie Orchestra from Berlin conducted by Kristjan Järvi (live on the Digital Concert Hall)
 Patricia Kopatchinskaja and the Staatskapelle of Berlin conducted by Pablo Heras-Casado - Berlin Philharmonic Concert Hall - For a film by Claus Wischmann - arte (2013)
 Alice Sara Ott plays the concerto en sol by Ravel with the Munich Philharmonic conducted by Lorin Maazel - arte (2012)
 Nils Frahm in concert at the Louisiana Museum of Modern Art (Denmark) for the Louisiana Channel (2012)
 Francesco Tristano Schlimé in concert at La scène Bastille, Paris - live for the website of abeillemusique.com (2006)
 Concerts at the Louisiana Museum of Modern Art, Denmark (2007-2010)
 Musique à l'Empéri Festival with Emmanuel Pahud, Paul Meyer and Eric Le Sage - Several seasons

Operas 
 The Tales of Hoffmann by Jacques Offenbach at the Opéra de Monte-Carlo with Juan Diego Flórez under the conducting of Jacques Lacombe - Staged by Jean-Louis Grinda - France 2, live on Culture Box (2018)
 Philémon et Baucis de Charles Gounod au Grand Théâtre de Tours staged by Julien Ostini under the conducting of Benjamin Pionnier - France 3 (2018)
 Tannhäuser by Richard Wagner at the Opéra de Monte-Carlo with José Cura under the conducting of Nathalie Stutzmann - staged by Jean-Louis Grinda - France 3, live on Culture Box (2017)
 Atys en folie parody of Atys by Lully for singers and puppeteers at the Teatru Manoel, Malta - Staged by Jean-Philippe Desrousseaux and produced by the Centre de musique baroque de Versailles (2017)
 Don Giovanni of Mozart at the Opéra de Monte-Carlo with Erwin Schrott staged by Jean-Louis Grinda - France 3, live on Culture Box (2015)
 Alcina of Haendel at La Monnaie, Brussels (Belgium) with Sandrine Piau staged by Pierre Audi under the conducting of Christophe Rousset - France 3, live on Mezzo Live HD (2015)
 Ernani of Verdi at the Opéra de Monte-Carlo with Ludovic Tézier staged by Jean-Louis Grinda - France 3 (2014)
 Idomeneo of Mozart at the Theater an der Wien, Vienna (Austria) with Richard Croft staged by Damiano Michieletto under the conducting of René Jacobs - live on Mezzo Live HD (2013)
 Medea by Guillaume Connesson at the Opéra de Vichy with Alexia Cousin staged by Jean-Claude Amyl (2005)

DVD

La leçon de musique de Jean-François Zygel 
 Episode Mozart
 Episode Schubert

Les clefs de l'orchestre de Jean-François Zygel 
 Episode Symphony 103 of Joseph Haydn
 Episode Boléro of Ravel
 Episode Pastoral symphony of Beethoven
 Episode New World Symphony of Anton Dvorak

Other DVD 
 Tribute concert for the 150 years of death of Hector Berlioz under conducting of Sir John Eliot Gardiner (DVD and Blu-ray) released by Chateau de Versailles Spectacles
 Ernani by Verdi staged by Jean-Louis Grinda - With Ramon Vargas, Ludovic Tézier, Alexander Vinogradov and Svetla Vassileva released by ArtHaus Musik
 Alcina by Haendel staged by Pierre Audi - With Sandrine Piau and Les Talents Lyriques under conducting of Christophe Rousset released by Alpha Classics (Outhere)
 Vespro della beata vergine by Monteverdi under conducting of John Eliot Gardiner (DVD and Blu-ray) - released by Alpha Classics (outhere)
 Bach Goldberg Variations with the pianist Alexandre Tharaud - Warner Music / Erato
 Turangalîla-Symphonie by Olivier Messiaen interpreted by the Berlin Junge Philharmonie Orchestra under the conducting of Kristjan Järvi
 Chamber music of the French composer Guillaume Connesson - Collection Pierre Bergé
 Works by the great romantics with Daishin Kashimoto, Éric Le Sage, Paul Meyer, François Salque and Jing Zhao - Louisiana Museum of Modern Art
 Frescobaldi Dialogues performed by Francesco Schlime - Abeille musique
 Joseph Kosma, chansons - Zig-Zag Territoires
 Vingt regards sur l'enfant-Jésus by Olivier Messiaen performed by Roger Muraro - Accor / Universal Music Classic
 Techno Parade Chamber music of Guillaume Connesson - RCA Red Seal / Sony Music
 Iannis Xenakis, Autour de la percussion with Pedro Carneiro - Zig-Zag Territoires
 Intégrale des sonates pour piano of Scriabine - Mécénat Musical Société Générale
 La musique, une passion, un partage - Mécénat Musical Société Générale

Documentaries 
 Lorin Maazel meets Alice Sara Ott (arte / ZDF)
 Roger Muraro : Un regard sur Olivier Messiaen (Mezzo)
 Autour de la percussion de Iannis Xenakis (Mezzo)
 Joseph Kosma, autour de l'enregistrement (Mezzo)
 Musique à l'Empéri, un vent de liberté (Mezzo)
 Entretien avec Guillaume Connesson
 La musique, une passion, un partage

Webdocumentaries 
 Iphigénie à l'Opéra : On vous dit tout - 15 films Series - Produced by Angers-Nantes Opéra (2020)

Films produced by Mécénat Musical Société Générale :
{{columns-list|
 Capt'Actions of Ivan Fedele in Théâtre Mogador, Paris
 Enregistrement du Clavier bien tempéré de Johann Sebastian Bach interpreted by Andreï Vieru
 Enregistrement des Sept dernières paroles du Christ en croix de Joseph Haydn - Ensemble Accentus - Laurence Equilbey
 Festival Printemps des Arts de Monte-Carlo
 Concours Avant-scènes à Radio France
 Quatuor Ardeo en concert Déclic à Radio France
 Enregistrement des Sonates de Johannes Brahms interpreted by Lise Berthaud
 25 ans du Conservatoire National Supérieur de Musique et Danse de Lyon
 La Chambre Philharmonique et Emmanuel Krivine en concert in Cité de la Musique, Paris
 Musiques des cours ottomane et européennes by Chimène Seymen in Institut du Monde Arabe
 Festival & Rencontres de musique de chambre du Larzac
 Musique entre deux temps, les Percussions de Strasbourg
 Théâtre des Bouffes du nord, un autre visage
 Festival Aspect des musiques d'aujourd'hui / Caen, "Made in Hungaria"
 Les Enfants en scène, l'opéra s'invite à l'école Concours International de piano d'Orléans / Concert de prestige 2009 Enregistrement du Quintette à deux violoncelles de Schubert with Alain Meunier and the quatuor Psophos
}}

 Louisiana Museum of Modern Art 
Boris Giltburg Five Minute Music Library Series

Musical Clips
 4 videoclips with Emmanuel Pahud : Bach, Allegro from Sonata in A minor - Debussy, Syrinx - Ferroud, Jade from Trois pieces for solo flute - Tchaikovsky, Lensky's Aria from Eugene Onegin
 Chamber Music of Guillaume Connesson (Chants de l'Agartha, Chants de l'Atlantide, Constellations) with Jérôme Pernoo, ...
 Christian Poltéra - Bach, Suite n°1, Sarabande
 Karen Gomyo and Christian Poltéra - Honegger, Sonatine for violin and cello
 Karen Gomyo - Piazzola, Tango-Étude for violin
 Sergey Malov - Bach, Invention 1 - Sinfonia 6
 Denis Kozhukhin - Prokofiev, Precipitato (3rd movement from 7th Sonata for piano) - First Prize at the 3rd Festival Pasqua de Cervera (Spain)
 Boris Giltburg - Rachmaninov, Prelude op. 23 N°7 - 4014 awarded as Best Music Video of American festival Directors Circle Festival of Shorts 
 Palle Mikkelborg - Capricorne Pyramid with Palle Mikkelborg, Michael Riessler and Wayne Siegel
 Octet by Felix Mendelssohn with Sergey Malov

Concerts
 Brahms - Trio with clarinet, cello and piano with Paul Meyer, Jing Zhao and Eric Le Sage
 Brahms - Trio with horn, violin and piano with Bruno Schneider, Daishin Kashimoto and Eric Le Sage
 Fauré - Quartet with piano with Daishin Kashimoto, Lise Berthaud, François Salque and Eric Le Sage
 Franck - Quintet with piano with Guy Braunstein, Daishin Kashimoto, Lise Berthaud, François Salque and Eric Le Sage
 Haendel - Passacaille with Daishin Kashimoto and Jing Zhao
 Schumann - Quartet with piano with Daishin Kashimoto, Lise Berthaud, François Salque and Eric Le Sage
 Schumann - Quintet with piano with Guy Braunstein, Daishin Kashimoto, Lise Berthaud, François Salque and Eric Le Sage
 Weber - Grand Duo Concertant with Paul Meyer and Eric Le Sage

 Musical clips for several labels
 Chamber Music of Francis Poulenc with Paul Meyer, Eric Le Sage, François Salque...
 Chamber Music of Guillaume Connesson (Techno Parade, initial dances, Sextuor, Chants de l'Agartha, Chants de l'Atlantide, Constellations) with Eric Le Sage, Paul Meyer, Jérôme Pernoo, Jérôme Ducros... Published by BMG/Sony and Collection Pierre Bergé
 Leonard Bernstein - Orchestre Lamoureux conducted by Yutaka Sado (West Side Story, On the Town, Wonderful Town...)
 Erik Satie - Orchestre Lamoureux conducted by Yutaka Sado
 Chansons of Joseph Kosma - Published by Zig-Zag Territoires
 Rebonds B de Iannis Xenakis - Published by Zig-Zag Territoires
 Bach Panther of Stéphane Delplace

Achievements 
 2016: Echo Award for the best DVD of the year 2016 Bach - Goldberg Variations with Alexandre Tharaud (2016) 
 2016: Diapason d'Or and Choc de Classica for the DVD Vespro della Beata Vergine by Monteverdy under conducting of John Eliot Gardiner
 2015: Best Music Video in american festival Directors Circle Festival of Shorts for the film 4014
 2013: First Prize for the music clip Precipitato starring the pianist Denis Kozhukhin at the 3rd 3rd Festival Pasqua de Cervera, Spain
 2011: Choc Classica for the DVD Musique de chambre by Guillaume Connesson
 2006: Choc de Classica for Jean-François Zygel's DVD (Haydn, Boléro and Schubert)
 2005: Choc du Monde de la Musique and Choc de Classica for the DVD Vingt Regards sur l'Enfant-Jésus by Olivier Messiaen with Roger Muraro
 2005: Diapason d'Or, Choc du Monde de la Musique and 10 de répertoire Classica for the DVD Techno Parade by Guillaume Connesson
 2004: Top Com d'Or of Paris
 2003: Prix Frères Lumière in Festival international des médias audiovisuels corporate du Creusot for the DVD of the 15 years anniversary of Mécénat Musical Société Générale
 2000: Dauphin de Bronze in Festival Comunica de Deauville for 2 films of internal communication of Mécénat Musical Société Générale (2000)

External links 
 
 Official website
 Website of the Digital Concert Hall
 Official Website of the Louisiana Museum of Modern Art
 Louisiana Music Official Website

References 

Living people
French music video directors
21st-century French male classical pianists
1971 births
People from Poissy